Alexander Field may refer to:

People
 Alexander Field (actor) (1892–1971), English actor
 Alexander Pope Field (1800–1876), American politician
 Alex Field (born 1986), American football player

Places
 Alexander Field (Blythe, California), a baseball venue in Blythe, California, United States
 Alexander Field (Purdue University), a baseball venue in West Lafayette, Indiana, United States
 South Wood County Airport, also known as Alexander Field

Field, Alexander